William Hammer may refer to:

 William C. Hammer (1865–1930), U.S. Representative from North Carolina
 William Joseph Hammer (1858–1934), pioneer electrical engineer and aviator
 William R. Hammer, paleontologist
 William Hammer (painter) (1821–1889), Danish artist